Collomia is a genus of flowering plants in the family Polemoniaceae. Species in the genus are known generally as trumpets, mountain trumpets, or trumpet flowers. They are native to North America and southern South America. The genus name comes from the Greek kolla ("glue"), a reference to the seeds, which become gelatinous in texture when wet.

There are about 15 species in the genus.

Species include:
Collomia biflora
Collomia debilis - alpine collomia
Collomia diversifolia – serpentine collomia
Collomia grandiflora – grand collomia, largeflowered collomia, California strawflower
Collomia heterophylla – variableleaf collomia
Collomia larsenii – talus collomia
Collomia linearis – tiny trumpet, narrow-leaf mountain trumpet
Collomia macrocalyx – bristleflower collomia
Collomia mazama – Mt. Mazama collomia, Crater Lake collomia
Collomia rawsoniana – flaming trumpet, Rawson's flaming trumpet
Collomia renacta – Barren Valley collomia
Collomia tenella – diffuse collomia
Collomia tinctoria – staining collomia, yellowstain collomia
Collomia tracyi – Tracy's collomia
Collomia wilkenii – Dieter's trumpet

References

External links
Tree of Life: Collomia
 

 
Polemoniaceae genera